is a town located in Soo District, Kagoshima Prefecture, Japan.

As of April 2017, the town has an estimated population of 13,488. The total area is 130 km².

Ōsaki is the birthplace of star baseball player Kōsuke Fukudome.

References

External links

Ōsaki official website 

Towns in Kagoshima Prefecture